The New Classification Scheme for Chinese Libraries is a system of library classification developed by Yung-Hsiang Lai since 1956.  It is modified from "A System of Book Classification for Chinese Libraries" of Liu Guojun, which is based on the Dewey Decimal System.

The scheme is developed for Chinese books, and commonly used in Taiwan, Hong Kong and Macau.

Main classes
000 Generalities
100 Philosophy
200 Religion
300 Sciences
400 Applied sciences
500 Social sciences
600 History of China and Geography of China
700 World history and Geography
800 Linguistics and Literature
900 Arts

Outline of the classification tables
000 Generalities
000 Special collections
010 Bibliography; Literacy (Documentation)
020 Library and information science; Archive management
030 Sinology
040 General encyclopedia
050 Serial publications; Periodicals
060 General organization; Museology
070 General collected essays
080 General series
090 Collected Chinese classics
100 Philosophy
100 Philosophy: general
110 Thought; Learning
120 Chinese philosophy
130 Oriental philosophy
140 Western philosophy
150 Logic
160 Metaphysics
170 Psychology
180 Esthetics
190 Ethics
200 Religion
200 Religion: general
210 Science of religion
220 Buddhism
230 Taoism
240 Christianity
250 Islam (Mohammedanism)
260 Judaism
270 Other religions
280 Mythology
290 Astrology; Superstition
300 Sciences
300 Sciences: general
310 Mathematics
320 Astronomy
330 Physics
340 Chemistry
350 Earth science; Geology
360 Biological science
370 Botany
380 Zoology
390 Anthropology
400 Applied sciences
400 Applied sciences: general
410 Medical sciences
420 Home economics
430 Agriculture
440 Engineering
450 Mining and metallurgy
460 Chemical engineering
470 Manufacture
480 Commerce: various business
490 Commerce: administration and management
500 Social sciences
500 Social sciences: general
510 Statistics
520 Education
530 Rite and custom
540 Sociology
550 Economy
560 Finance
570 Political science
580 Law; Jurisprudence
590 Military science
600-700 History and geography
600 History and geography: General 
History and geography of China
610 General history of China
620 Chinese history by period
630 History of Chinese civilization
640 Diplomatic history of China
650 Historical sources
660 Geography of China
670 Local history
680 Topical topography
690 Chinese travels
World history and geography
710 World: general history and geography
720 Oceans and seas
730 Asia: history and geography
740 Europe: history and geography
750 America: history and geography
760 Africa: history and geography
770 Oceania: history and geography
780 Biography
790 Antiquities and archaeology
800 Linguistics and literature
800 Linguistics: general
810 Literature: general
820 Chinese literature
830 Chinese literature: general collections
840 Chinese literature: individual works
850 Various Chinese literature
860 Oriental literature
870 Western literature
880 Other countries literatures
890 Journalism
900 Arts
900 Arts: general
910 Music
920 Architecture
930 Sculpture
940 Drawing and painting; Calligraphy
950 Photography; Computer art
960 Decorative arts
970 Arts and Crafts movement
980 Theatre
990 Recreation and leisure

See also

Decimal systems
 Dewey Decimal Classification
 Korean decimal classification
 Nippon Decimal Classification

Non-decimal systems
 Chinese Library Classification
 Library of Congress Classification

Knowledge representation
Library cataloging and classification